Ectoedemia argyropeza  is a moth of the family Nepticulidae. It is a widespread species, with a Holarctic distribution. It is found in most of Europe, as well as North America. In Russia, it is found in St. Petersburg, Moscow, Kaluga, Tatarstan and Kaliningrad. It is also known from north-eastern China.

The wingspan is 7 mm. The head is ochreous-yellow with a whitish collar. The antennal eyecaps are also whitish. Forewings dark fuscous ; a small costal spot before middle, and a larger dorsal spot before the tornus whitish ; outer half of cilia whitish. Hindwings grey.

Adults are on wing from May to June. It is a parthenogenetic species, with males being extremely rare.

The larvae feed on Populus tremula and Populus tremuloides (ssp. downesi). They mine the leaves of their host plant. It first bores in the petiole, resulting in a swelling. When the larva reaches the leaf disc, it makes an elongate blotch between the midrib and the first lateral vein. The frass is concentrated in two stripes parallel to the sides of the mine. Pupation takes place outside of the mine.

Subspecies
Ectoedemia argyropeza argyropeza
Ectoedemia argyropeza downesi Wilkinson and Scoble, 1979 (North America)

References

External links
bladmineerders.nl
Ectoedemia argyropeza images at  Consortium for the Barcode of Life
Nepticulidae from the Volga and Ural region
UKmoths
Swedish moths

Nepticulidae
Moths of Europe
Moths of Asia
Moths of North America
Moths described in 1839